The River Greese (also spelled Griese) is a small, fast-flowing river in south-east, Ireland, and a tributary of the River Barrow.

Name

The river takes its name from Killeen Cormac, which bears the name capella de Gris ("Gris Chapel") in Crede Mihi, a c. 1280 ancient register of the Archbishops of Dublin, with the name also spelled Grys/Gryse in later accounts, and the rivulus de Grys appearing in John Alen's 1533 Reportorium Viride. Jacob Nevill's 1760 map shows the River Greeces, while Greese  is the spelling generally used in the modern day, although Griese is also used.

Course
The river rises near Dunlavin, County Wicklow in the townland of Tober. It then runs south-west and forms part of the County Wicklow/Kildare border. The Greese continues west past Killeen Cormac (formerly capella de Gris, from which the river takes its name). It is bridged by the R448 road at Moyleabbey, County Kildare. It meets a tributary in Crookstown and passes under the R415, then flows southward through Ballitore. The Greese flows south-southwest, crossing under the M9, through Kilkea Golf Club and past Kilkea Castle, passing under the Dublin–Waterford railway line at Newtownpilsworth/Dunmanoge and draining into the River Barrow in the Jerusalem townland, Painestown downstream of Maganey Lock (this last stretch forms part of the County Carlow/Kildare border).

Wildlife

Fish include brown trout. stone loach, Atlantic salmon, European eel, three-spined stickleback and European river lamprey.

References

Rivers of County Carlow
Rivers of County Kildare
Rivers of County Offaly
Rivers of County Wicklow